Gerald Johnson may refer to:

Gerald Johnson (musician) (born 1943), musician with the Steve Miller Band
Gerald W. Johnson (writer) (1890–1980), American journalist and author
Gerald W. Johnson (nuclear expert) (1917–2005), nuclear specialist
Gerald W. Johnson (military officer) (1919–2002), United States Air Force officer
Gerald George Drummond Johnson (born 1976), Costa Rican footballer
Gerald Johnson (Ontario politician)
Gerald Johnson (Georgia politician) in 135th Georgia General Assembly
Gerald Clyde Johnson (born 1975), baseball player
Gerald "Slink" Johnson, American actor
Gerald R. Johnson, World War II flying ace for the United States Army Air Forces

See also
Jerry Johnson (disambiguation)
Gerard Johnson (disambiguation)
Gerald Johnston (1891–1968), Australian rules footballer
Gerald MacIntosh Johnston, Canadian actor